The South Yorkshire County Council (SYCC) — also known as South Yorkshire Metropolitan County Council — was the top-tier local government authority for the metropolitan county of South Yorkshire from 1 April 1974 to 31 March 1986. A strategic authority, with responsibilities for roads, public transport, planning, emergency services and waste disposal, it was composed of 100 directly elected members drawn from the four metropolitan boroughs of South Yorkshire: Barnsley, Doncaster, Rotherham and Sheffield.

History
SYCC was constituted by the Local Government Act 1972 and elections in 1973 resulted in the county council acting as a 'shadow authority' until the authority was formally established on 1 April 1974. SYCC was abolished on 31 March 1986, just 12 years after it was established, following the Local Government Act 1985. Its powers were transferred to the four metropolitan borough councils of South Yorkshire (which had shared power with SYCC): Barnsley Metropolitan Borough Council, Doncaster Metropolitan Borough Council, Rotherham Metropolitan Borough Council and Sheffield City Council.

Political control
The first election to the council was held in 1973, initially operating as a shadow authority before coming into its powers on 1 April 1974. Political control of the council from 1973 until its abolition in 1986 was always held by the Labour Party:

Leadership
The first leader of the council, Ron Ironmonger, had been the last leader of the old Sheffield City Council. The leaders of South Yorkshire County Council were:

Council elections

1973 South Yorkshire County Council election
1977 South Yorkshire County Council election
1981 South Yorkshire County Council election

Successor bodies
Following the abolition of SYCC in 1986, its administrative functions were mostly devolved to the four constituent metropolitan borough councils in South Yorkshire. In practice, many functions continued to be jointly administered by joint authorities supported by the South Yorkshire Joint Secretariat. Although the county council was abolished, South Yorkshire remains a metropolitan and ceremonial county with a Lord Lieutenant of South Yorkshire and  a High Sheriff.

The Sheffield City Region Combined Authority was established on 1 April 2014 as the strategic top-tier authority for South Yorkshire. The combined authority exercises some functions formerly held by SYCC, with powers over transport and economic development.

See also
People's Republic of South Yorkshire

References

Local authorities in South Yorkshire
1986 disestablishments in England
1973 establishments in England
Former county councils of England